Hill Top, Kentucky or Hilltop, Kentucky may refer to

Hill Top, Fleming County, Kentucky
Hill Top, McCreary County, Kentucky
Hill Top, Menifee County, Kentucky
Hilltop, Kentucky